The Priest River Commercial Core Historic District, in Priest River, Idaho, is a historic district which was listed on the National Register of Historic Places in 1995.

The district is roughly bounded by Wisconsin, Montgomery, and Cedar Streets and Albeni Road in Priest River.

The oldest contributing building is the Citizen's State Bank (1912); the newest is the Interstate Telephone Company Building (1924).

References

External links

Historic districts on the National Register of Historic Places in Idaho
National Register of Historic Places in Bonner County, Idaho
Buildings and structures completed in 1924